Loch is the surname of a Scottish Lowlands family whose members have included:
George Loch of Drylaw (1749-1788), Edinburgh land-owner
James Loch (1780–1855), Scottish estate commissioner and later a Member of Parliament
John Loch (1781–1868), Chairman of the East India Company
George Loch (1811–1887), Member of Parliament
Henry Loch, 1st Baron Loch (1827–1900), Scottish soldier and colonial administrator
Edward Loch, 2nd Baron Loch (1873–1942), senior British Army officer
Joice NanKivell Loch (1887–1982), Australian author, journalist and humanitarian
Kenneth Loch (1890–1961), Lieutenant-General, a Scottish soldier and defence planner
Tam Dalyell, born Thomas Dalyell Loch, a Scottish politician; Labour Member of Parliament from 1962 to 2005

Loch is also a German surname:

Christoph Loch, Director (Dean) of Cambridge Judge Business School at the University of Cambridge
Felix Loch (born 1989), German luger and Olympic champion
Hans Loch (1898-1960), East German politician
Herbert Loch (1886–1976), German general during World War II

Other people with the surname Loch include:

Samuel Loch (born 1983), Australian rower

See also
Lough (surname)

Loch Sylvia www.sylvialoch.com equestrian author
Surnames of Lowland Scottish origin